Mahanam Sampraday is a Krishnaite revival movement founded in the last decade 19th century within Bengali Vaishnavism in Bengal Presidency of colonial British India and spiritually inspired by figure of Prabhu Jagadbandhu. As
tradition-sampradaya and institution it was formed in early 20th century by Sripad Mahendraji Presently followers of Mahanam Sampraday are centered in West Bengal, India and throughout Bangladesh. Radha Krishna, Gour Nitai and Prabhu Jagadbandu are the chief deities worshiped by the Mahanam Sampraday.

History of formation

Arrival of new incarnation 
Formation of Mahanam Sampraday started with the advent of Prabhu Jagadbandhu (28 April 1871 – 1921)—a mystic and author of kirtan songs—who was the focus of a new revival movement within the Bengali Vaishnavas in the last decade 19th century, and whom Mahanam Sampraday (and many others) believe as an avatar of Krishna as Chaitanya Mahaprabhu and Nityananda Ram. At the first time, in 1891 Annada Charan Datta—the leader of Hari Sabha, a circle of devotees at Hooghly—was reported to have had a vision that Chaitanya Mahaprabhu was reincarnate in the form of Prabhu Jagadbandhu.

Prabhu Jagadbandu was a great Hindu saint and yogi from Chaitanya Sampradaya. He said

Preaching of Vaishnavism by Prabhu Jagadbandhu. Mahagambhira Lila 
Prabhu Jagadbandhu preached Krishnaite Vaishnavism for 30 years. He asked people to chant the holy name of God (Radha Krishna or Gour Nitai), to develop love for God or prem. He urged everyone to love all creatures irrespective of caste or creed.

Later in 1902 Prabhu Jagadbandu closed him in a small cottage and stayed there for 17 years. This time period is referred to as the 'Maha Gambhira Lila' (in contrast to Chaitanya Mahaprabhu's Gambhira Lila).

Early mission to the West 
Already during the formation of this tradition, one of its representatives became the first Krishnaite missionary in the West. Prabhu Jagadbandu's friend and follower, sannyasin  (1858–1914) went to the US in 1902, where he gave lectures, founded in 1902 the short-lived Krishna Samaj society in New York City and built a temple in Los Angeles. He was an author of the first full-length treatment of Bengal Vaishnavism in English Sree Krishna—the Lord of Love (New York, 1904) and sent the book to Russian writer Leo Tolstoy, who was intrigued and used text for composition his notable Letter to a Hindoo.

Leadership of Sripad Mahendraji and formation of Mahanam Sampraday
Sripad Mahendraji renounced the world at an early age of 20 years. He went to Vrindavan in search of lord Krishna. later, he went to Sri Angan, Faridpur, Bangladesh where Prabhu Jagadbandhu was at that time, in the small cottage.

Sripad Mahendraji decided to settle in Sri Angan and lead the life of an ashramite Brahmachari i.e. Living in a ashram and follow Brahmacarya.

After few years, Prabhu jagadbandhu employed Sripad Mahendraji with a mission. Prabhu Jagadbandu asked Sripad Mahendraji to organise a band of selfless Brahmacharies i.e. those who follow Brahmacarya. He asked Sripad Mahendraji to go with the band of Brahmacharies from place to place and preach the 'Mahanam'.

Accordingly, a band of about 50 sannyasins was assembled, who together founded the Mahanam Sampraday under the leadership of Sripad Mahendraji.

Later Sripad Mahendraji made his disciple Dr. Mahanambrata Brahmachariji, the head of Mahanam Sampraday.

Mahanam Sampraday under Dr. Mahanambrataji 

After the formation of Mahanam Sampraday, Sripad Mahendraji received letter of invitation for the 2nd parliament of world religion ( or more commonly the world fellowship of faiths ) in the year 1933.

Sripad Mahendra ji sent Mahanambrata Brahmachariji, a scholarly leader of Sampradaya, as a deligate to Chicago to attend the conference.

After returning from Chicago and after the death of Sripad Mahendraji, Dr. Mahanambrata Brahmachariji was made the head of Mahanam Sampraday.

Under his guidance Mahanam Sampraday developed further. Thus, 'Mahanam Sevak Sangha', a subsidiary of Mahanam Sampradaya was established for the non-ashramite followers. 'Mahanambrata Cultural and Welfare Trust', a publication was also initiated by Dr. Mahanambrata Brahmachariji.

Mahanam Sampraday in present 
Dr. Mahanambrata Brahmachariji allowed Srimat Nabanibandhu Brahmachari and Srimat Upasakbandhu Brahmachari to carry forward the guru parampara or spiritual lineage or. allowed them to give mantra diksha or initiate devotees.

By the time Dr. Mahanambrata Brahmachariji  left the world in 1999, Bangladesh attained its liberation.

So, in 1999, Srimat Nabanibandhu Brahmachari became the head of Mahanam Sampraday in Bangladesh and Srimat Upasakbandhu Brahmachari became the head of Mahanam Sampraday in India.

When Srimat Nabanibandhu Brahmachari left the world Srimat Kantibandhu Brahmachari became the head of Mahanam Sampraday in Bangladesh.

Therefore, Srimat Upasakbandhu Brahmachari Srimat Kantibandhu Brahmachari are the head of Mahanam Sampraday in India and Bangladesh respectively.

Philosophy/Ideology of Mahanam Sampraday 
Mahanam Sampraday is a new Krishnaite Vaishava denomination. It believes in attaining the five principals of Mansatvya or Humanity namely-

1.Achourya [also called Asteya].(Not to steal)

2.Ahimsa. (Non-Violence)

3.Satya ( to be truthful)

4. Samyama ( Self-restraint)

5.shaucha  ( cleanliness of both inner self and body )

Dr. Mahanambrata Brahmachariji once said the following about Mahanam Sampraday's philosophy called Manav Dharma -

Mahanam Mahakirtan 
According to Mahanam Sampraday, Mahanam Mahakirtan is a key aspect of their religious practice/cult. Mahanam literally means 'Great name'. It generally refers to the following lines from Prabhu Jagadbandhu's book named 'Chandrapath'
Mahakirtan means 'Great Kirtan or congregation chanting of holy name of lord.'

So, Mahanam Mahakirtan literary means congregation chanting of above mentioned Mahanam. Whereas, Mahanam Mahakirtan more generally refers to the ceaseless congregation chanting of Mahanam around the sandalwood casket placed first in Sri Angan but later moved to Mahendrababu Angan, a prominent temple of Mahanam Sampraday in Ghurni, Krishnanagar, India. The sandalwood casket called 'Shree Samput' preserves the holy body of Prabhu Jagadbandhu . Dr. Mahanambrata Brahmachariji and Mahanam Sampraday believes that Prabhu Jagadbandhusundar will someday come out the casket after hearing the Mahanam Mahakirtan.

Mahanam Mahakirtan was started on 18 October 1921 and continuing till date. Mahanam Mahakirtan is also known as Mahanam 'Yajna'.

Social Activities of Mahanam Sampraday 
Social Activities of Mahanam Sampraday are carried out by  'Mahanam Sevak Sangha', a subsidiary of Mahanam Sampradaya.

Since 1981, Mahanam Sampraday runs a charitable dispensary (free except 1 INR for registration of each patient) named 'Sri Sri Prabhu Jagatbandhu Sevangan'.

Free medical camps are organised every year by Mahanam Sampraday on the event of Ganga Sagar mela, an annual fair for pilgrims at Southern part of Sagar Island of West Bengal, India. Few ambulances are also operated by Mahanam Sampraday.

Mahanam Sampraday also donate free blankets for the poor and needy people in the winter months. Mahanam Sampraday runs two schools of their own and also provide free books for the needy and meritorious students.

Temples of Mahanam Sampraday 
Mahanam Sampraday has over dozens of temples in India and Bangladesh.Some prominent temples are listed below -

There are some more temples of Mahanam Sampraday which are not included in the above list.

See also 
Sri Angan
Prabhu Jagadbandhu
Dr. Mahanambrata Brahmachariji

References

External links 
 Official website 

Anti-caste movements
Krishnaite Vaishnava denominations
Hindu new religious movements
Hindu organizations
Hindu organisations based in Bangladesh
Organisations based in Kolkata
Hinduism in Kolkata
Hinduism in West Bengal
Hinduism in Bangladesh
1891 establishments in British India